SYT1-associated neurodevelopmental disorder, also known as Baker-Gordon Syndrome, is a rare genetic disorder caused by mutations in the synaptotagmin-1 (SYT1) gene.

Signs and symptoms
Patients present with neurodevelomental impairments and symptoms including:
 Infantile hypotonia
 Congenital ophthalmic abnormalities
 Childhood onset hyperkinetic movement disorder
 Stereotypical motor behaviour
 Moderate to profound developmental delay or intellectual disability
 Sleep disturbance
 Episodic agitation

Epileptic seizures are not a feature of this disorder (despite abnormal EEG) and head circumference is typically normal.

Genetics

This condition is caused by heterozygous mutations in the SYT1 gene, located on the long arm of chromosome 12 (12q21.2), which are inherited in an autosomal dominant fashion.

Pathogenesis

Synaptotagmin-1 is a predominantly presynaptic Ca2+-sensor involved in synaptic vesicle exocytosis and  endocytosis. In SYT1-associated neurodevelopmental disorder, mutations disrupt synaptotagmin-1 function causing a reduction in neurotransmitter release.

Diagnosis

This disorder may be suspected on the basis of the clinical features listed above and abnormal EEG recording. Diagnosis is made through genetic testing with sequencing of the SYT1 gene.

Management

At present, only supportive management of symptoms is available as there is no known curative treatment for this condition.

History

The first case of SYT1-associated neurodevelopmental disorder was described in 2015 and it was classified as a syndrome in 2018. It was named after Sarah Gordon and Kate Baker, who first discovered and described it.

References 

Neurological disorders
Genetic diseases and disorders
Rare syndromes
Autosomal dominant disorders